Himanka is a former municipality of Finland.
Himanka was consolidated with the neighboring town of Kalajoki on January 1, 2010.

It is located in the Central Ostrobothnia region.

The municipality is unilingually Finnish. The villages of Ainali, Himankakylä, Pahkala, Pernu, Pöntiö, Rautila, Saarenpää, Tomujoki, Torvenkylä, and Hillilä all belonged to the municipality.

The main products of the area include farm products and fox and mink furs. There is also some wood and plastics product design and manufacturing.

The oldest part of the central Himanka is called Raumankari. At the heart of Himanka is the river Lestijoki which empties into the Gulf of Bothnia.

References

Further reading
 Ahti Pöyhtäri and Olavi Himanka wrote a book called "Himanka, Ratkaisun vuodet" about the history of Himanka in the wars of 1917–1918, 1939–1940, and 1941–1945. Published in 1990 by Himangan sotaveteraanit, Sotainvalidien veljesliiton Himangan osasto. 
 Photographic pictures taken by Risto Tuorila from various places in Himanka was published in the year 2000 by Lestijokilaakson Kirjapaino. 
 Ari-Veikko Anttiroiko wrote about the history of the Harbor of Himanka in his book called "Himangan sataman historia" published by Gummerus Oy in 1984. 
 Anni Kohtala and Maija Märsylä have arranged news paper clippings and other material provided by shipper Sakari Pöyhtäri into a book about the history of Himanka, which was published by Himangan Kotiseutuyhdisys in 1979. 
 Teuvo Tuorila has written a book about history of the school system in Himanka from 1876–2001. Published by Art-Print Oy, Kokkola 2001. 
 Ahti Pöyhtäri has written the history of religious movement based on Laestadian Lutheranism. The name of the publication is "Himangan Rauhanyhdistyksen Historiaa 100-vuotiselta taipaleelta." Publisher is Himangan Rauhan Sana r.y. 1994. 
 Pekka Tuorila has written "Kotiseudun Kaikuja", a compilation book which includes council documents from Raumankari townhouse, three plays, few stories and more additional amusements from years past. Published by KL-Paino, Ylivieska, 2004.

External links

Municipality of Himanka – Official website

Populated coastal places in Finland
Former municipalities of Finland
Kalajoki
Populated places established in 1868
Populated places disestablished in 2010